"Mad Hatter" is a song by Avenged Sevenfold, released as the lead single from the EP Black Reign on September 17, 2018. It was made specifically for the video game Call of Duty: Black Ops 4 (2018), appearing as an easter egg in the game's "IX" Zombies map. It is the first original song by the band since the release of "Dose", which was a bonus track from The Stage in 2016.

Background
With the band having a strong connection with Treyarch, having previously worked on Call of Duty: Black Ops, Call of Duty: Black Ops II and Call of Duty: Black Ops III, they were once again asked to make a song for their 2018 title Call of Duty: Black Ops 4. The band included a sneak peek of the song in their European Tour.

Synyster Gates expressed his excitement of the new song, stating: "We're just about in a state of pure bliss.... We're damn close to getting to exactly where we want to be". M Shadows also commented saying: "The EP is the start of a new era. I'm not sure what that holds for us yet, but we are excited…"

Johnny Christ chimed in: "It's a fun song — it's a little bit of a departure from I think what our fans would expect, but I guess that also makes sense because they expect crazy from us now."

Recording and musical style

The song was recorded in March 2018 in Los Angeles and produced once again by Joe Barresi, before Shadows formed nodes on his vocal chords and couldn't sing for at least a few months.

With Shadows being an avid gamer he was excited about the release being a brand new experience and wanting to write something completely new direction-wise. When asked about the direction of the song he said "We felt that we should take a similar leap with the music and go for something bigger, darker and more cerebral....Watching the initial trailers and looking at production sketches reminded me of the 'S-Town' podcast and its main protagonist, John B. McLemore. Shadows also commented specifically on the lyrics: "I decided that the lyrics would shadow McLemore's life. The result is a thick-grooved song that's dynamic and has a weightiness to it."

He also spoke to Kerrang! to discuss the topic further while also revealing they weren't going to release anything until a fan mentioned something via a Twitter Q&A:

"The song is dark and brooding. We wanted to capture a different feeling than a straight-ahead 'zombie killer' track. These songs are good places for us to experiment with our sound. I would put this in the category of 'dark alternative.'"

Shadows further eIaborated on the process: "I did a Twitter takeover where a fan asked me about doing music for Black Ops 3... Treyarch saw it and asked us to participate. I went into the studio and saw what they were working on. We only had a month to get them a finished product, because of our European tour. We wrote what we felt would be a departure for not only us, but Treyarch as well."

A video using "game footage" was released to present the song.

Release
After releasing the song on the  September 17, the band changed the mix and re-released a new version after fans noticed the song was off and addressed the issue in a Q&A:

"We saw some complaints about the mix and we totally agree with you! We were pushing the limits in a lot of different ways and once the compression of streaming services and radio got a hold of it the clarity become muddied. I heard it on the radio and was like 'Oh Shit!' The good news is we live in a world were you can quickly fix your mistakes and we have done just that."...

M Shadows continued: "I'd put this in the "we fucked up" category,"  "Mixing and mastering happened while we were in Europe and we were getting stuff sent over and all listening on different headphones. Old mix just pushed it a little far but no one had a set of speakers we trusted being on the road and such. By the time we got home we were used to the sound but hearing it on the radio next to other things allowed us to gain some perspective on it".

Personnel
Personnel adapted from Tidal.

Avenged Sevenfold
 M. Shadows – vocals, songwriter
 Synyster Gates – guitar, songwriter
 Zacky Vengeance – guitar, songwriter
 Johnny Christ – bass guitar, songwriter
 Brooks Wackerman – drums

Technical personnel
 Joe Barresi – producer, recording engineer
 Yosimar Gomez – assistant engineer
 Brian Montgomery – Pro Tools
 Andy Wallace – mixing engineer

Charts

References

2018 singles
2018 songs
Avenged Sevenfold songs
Alternative metal songs